Ilya Vladislavovich Konstantinov (born December 28, 1956, Leningrad) is a Russian statesman, political and public figure; People's Deputy of the RSFSR, member of the Council of the Republic of the Supreme Soviet of Russia (1990-1993); Director of the Department of the Institute for the Development of Civil Society and Local Self-Government (until January 2009).

In 1993, he sharply opposed the strengthening of the presidential power.

He is the father of the nationalist politician Daniil Konstantinov.

References

External links
 Илья Константинов: «Додавить гной пока не получается»

1956 births
Living people
Defenders of the White House (1991)
Defenders of the White House (1993)
Politicians from Saint Petersburg
Saint Petersburg State University alumni
A Just Russia politicians
Russian human rights activists